Lauren Embree and Asia Muhammad were the defending champions, but Embree chose not to participate. 

Muhammad partnered Arina Rodionova, and successfully defended her title. The pair defeated Shuko Aoyama and Risa Ozaki in the final, 6–4, 6–3.

Seeds

Draw

References 
 Draw

Bendigo Women's International - Doubles